Bedřich Hamsa (born 25 October 1965) is a Czech former football player. He played in the Czechoslovak First League for Slavia Prague and Bohemians Prague. Hamsa later played for Drnovice in the Czech First League, scoring four times in 26 matches in its inaugural season.  He was top goal scorer in the 1994–95 Czech 2. Liga, scoring 22 goals for LeRK Brno that season. He subsequently played in the Czech 2. Liga for Teplice and Ústí nad Labem.

Honours

Individual 
 Czech 2. Liga top goalscorer: 1994–95

References

Czech footballers
Czech First League players
1965 births
Living people
SK Slavia Prague players
Bohemians 1905 players
FK Drnovice players
FK Teplice players
FK Ústí nad Labem players
FK Baník Most players
Association football forwards
Footballers from Prague